Bad Things may refer to:

 Bad Things (band), American synthrock band started by snowboarder Shaun White
 "Bad Things" (Jace Everett song), the theme to HBO's True Blood
 "Bad Things" (Machine Gun Kelly and Camila Cabello song)
 "Bad Things," a song by Cults from their 2011 album Cults
 "Bad Things", a song by Milky Chance from their 2017 album Blossom
 "Bad Things", a song by Mini Mansions from their 2019 album Guy Walks into a Bar...
 "Bad Things", a song by Alison Wonderland from her 2022 album Loner
 "Bad Things", a song by I Prevail from their 2022 album True Power